Rebels: City of Indra (also known as Rebels: The Story of Lex and Livia or Rebels: City of Indra: The Story of Lex and Livia) is a 2014 science fiction/dystopian novel by Kendall Jenner, Kylie Jenner, and ghostwriter Maya Sloan.

Background
Kylie spoke about the novel, saying "The fans seem to love it. That’s why we did it, [the characters]' names are Lexi and Livia. I think we wanted to make Lex more like me and Livia more like Kendall, and they kind of evolved into their own characters."

Main characters
Lex and Livia Cosmo — are the twin daughters of Arnaud Cosmos and Delphia. Lex is a hard-scrabbled, bullheaded, tough-talking orphan while Livia is an indignant, bullheaded debutant orphan. They both have a small neon-green symbol on their eyes. 
Marius — is a semi-ineffectual pseudo-intellectual who runs about citing manners for Livia. 
The Governess —  is Livia's beauty-obsessed debutante coach who gets her wrinkles removed yearly at the Rejuvenation Island Clinic

Reception
The bibliophile website Goodreads reported a 59% approval rating, with a rating of 2.73/5 based on 189 reviews. Customer reviews on Amazon give the book rating average of 1.7 out of 5 stars. Customer reviews on Google Play give it an average of 4.1/5 based on 303 reviews.

Publishers Weekly gave a positive review: "Details about the two worlds the girls inhabit are creative, though the plot that emerges after they meet is rather predictable. Even so, abundant action — including a hair-pulling fight, a high-speed chase on flying machines, and an attack by hideous beings known as 'mutations' — provides momentum. Unresolved conflicts set the scene for the next installment."

References

2014 American novels
American science fiction novels
American young adult novels
Children's science fiction novels
American adventure novels
Pocket Books books
Television shows related to the Kardashian–Jenner family